The Great Mosque of Raqqa or Al-Qadim Mosque is the oldest mosque in Raqqa, Syria, located at the northern section of the city's heart. The outer walls of the mosque are constructed of mud bricks supported by solid semi-circular buttress towers. The prayer hall consisted of three arcades supported on cylindrical piers, whilst the other three sides were lined with double arcades. The building is decorated with stucco, traces of which survive.

The mosque was built by the Abbasids in 772 CE, under the reign of caliph al-Mansur. All that remains of the mosque today are the baked brick minaret and the prayer hall (haram) façade with eleven arches that were added by Nur ad-Din Zangi during the 1165 renovation of the mosque. The mosque is currently in ruins. There used to be a small shrine in the center attributed to Wabisa Ibn Ma'bad Al-Asadi.

Damage 
The first damage to al-Qadim Mosque occurred under ISIS-control of the city. DigitalGlobe satellite imagery illustrated that between October 2013 and February 2014, the small Ottoman-period shrine built in 1836 CE, around the purported grave of Wabisa Ibn Ma’bad al-Asadi, a companion of the Prophet Muhammad, was bulldozed. Images were later released of the shrine's destruction.

In June 2017, at the start of operations by the US-backed Syrian Democratic Forces and the Raqqa Media Office reported that shelling had struck the mosque and the surrounding areas, resulting in casualties.

Cemetery 
The courtyard of the mosque was a graveyard for residents who could not make safe to cemeteries.

References

Bibliography

8th-century mosques
Abbasid architecture
Mosques in Raqqa
Religious buildings and structures completed in 772